Wunnummin Lake is a lake in northwestern Ontario, Canada. It is a remote freshwater lake, located in Kenora District.

The Wunnumin 1 Indian reserve of the Wunnumin Lake First Nation is located in the southwestern part of the lake.

See also
List of lakes in Ontario

References

Lakes of Kenora District